Retro Futurism (stylized as REtro Futurism) is the second and final extended play by South Korean co-ed group Triple H. It was released on July 18, 2018 by Cube Entertainment, with "Retro Future" serving as its lead-single.

Background and release 
On June 26, 2018, a source from Cube Entertainment stated that the group will be making a comeback on July 18 with no further details. On the same day, the group revealed through a magazine interview that theme for this album will be the collaboration of retro and futurism, resulting in the album's name, Retro Futurism. They also revealed that they were going to a time where people were using folder phones and pagers, and also were inspired by retro singers. On July 13, the group revealed the track list through a video on various platforms.

The EP was released on July 18, 2018, through several music portals, including MelOn in South Korea and iTunes for the global market.

Track listing

Charts

References 

2018 EPs
Cube Entertainment EPs